Henry Steps Out is a 1940 British comedy film directed by Widgey R. Newman and starring George Turner, Margaret Yarde and Wally Patch. On the outbreak of the Second World War an idler is forced to join the army by his domineering wife.

Main cast
 George Turner as Henry Smith 
 Margaret Yarde as Cynthia Smith  
 Wally Patch as Wally

References

Bibliography
 Chibnall, Steve & McFarlane, Brian. The British 'B' Film. Palgrave MacMillan, 2009.

External links

1940 films
British comedy films
1940 comedy films
Films directed by Widgey R. Newman
Films set in England
British black-and-white films
Quota quickies
1940s English-language films
1940s British films